Evernight is the fourth studio album by the Finnish heavy metal band Battlelore, released in 2007. As previously, the songs are all based on J. R. R. Tolkien's Middle-earth. Overall the sound of the album was darker and denser than the band's earlier releases with a much thicker and heavier guitar sound. The album also was more consistent in sound with less variation between songs to present a more cohesive piece of work. In this album the band choose not to use names and direct references to Tolkien's legendarium to make the lyrics accessible to a broader audience.

Track listing

Personnel
Band members
Kaisa Jouhki - vocals
Tomi Mykkänen - vocals
Jussi Rautio - guitar, backing vocals
Jyri Vahvanen - guitar, backing vocals
Timo Honkanen - bass
Henri Vahvanen - drums
Maria Honkanen - keyboards

Production
Miitri Aaltonen - producer, engineer, mixing
Mika Jussila - mastering at Finnvox Studios

References

External links
 Battlelore Official Homepage

2007 albums
Battlelore albums
Napalm Records albums